Edward Joseph Riska Sr. (October 4, 1919 – August 3, 1992) was an American basketball player.  He was an All-American college player at Notre Dame and played several years in the National Basketball League (NBL) of the United States.  Riska was the MVP during the World Professional Basketball Tournament in 1942.

Riska played five seasons for the Oshkosh All-Stars of the NBL, averaging 4.1 points over 152 games.  After the close of his professional career, he became a high school coach for De La Salle Institute in Chicago, his alma mater.

References

External links
NBL stats

1919 births
1992 deaths
All-American college men's basketball players
American men's basketball players
Basketball coaches from Illinois
Basketball players from Chicago
De La Salle Institute alumni
Forwards (basketball)
Guards (basketball)
High school basketball coaches in the United States
Notre Dame Fighting Irish men's basketball players
Oshkosh All-Stars coaches
Oshkosh All-Stars players
Player-coaches
Sportspeople from Chicago